The Gayo people are an ethnic group living in the highlands of Aceh Province, Sumatra, Indonesia. The Gayo tribe has a population of 336,856 and they live predominantly in the mountains. Most Gayo live in three regencies in Aceh namely Bener Meriah, Central Aceh, and Gayo Lues. Some of them live in several districts in other regencies, such as Serbejadi District, Simpang Jernih District, and Peunaron District in East Aceh Regency and Beutong District in Nagan Raya Regency. Other than that, the Gayo population also covers Southeast Aceh Regency and Aceh Tamiang Regency. Their homeland lies in the Barisan Mountains which has elevations of over 12,000 feet and extends more than one thousand miles. The Gayonese language has four dialects: Lut, Serbejadi-Lukup, Lut and Luwes. Their language does not have a writing system, but folk tales, stories and poetry are passed down in oral tradition. The traditional house of the Gayo is called Umah.

History
In the 11th century, the Linge Kingdom was established by the Gayo people during the reign of Sultan Makhdum Johan Berdaulat Mahmud Syah from the Perlak Sultanate, as it was told by two rulers who were ruling during the Dutch East Indies era; namely Raja Uyem and his son Raja Ranta, who is Raja Cik Bebesen, and also Zainuddin from the rulers of Kejurun Bukit. Raja Linge I is said to have four children. The eldest was his daughter, Empu Beru or Datu Beru, and the remaining are Sebayak Lingga (Ali Syah), Meurah Johan (Johan Syah) and Meurah Lingga (Malamsyah). Sebayak Lingga wandered off to Karo land and founded a country there and he was known as Raja Lingga Sibayak. Meurah Johan ventured on to Aceh Besar and established his kingdom by the name of Lam Krak or Lam Oeii or also known as Lamuri or Lamuri Sultanate. This would mean that the Lamuri Sultanate was founded by Meurah Johan, while Meurah Lingga who was living in Linge, Gayo and the rest became kings of Linge for generations. Meurah Silu migrated to Pasai and became an officer to the Pasai Sultanate there. Meurah Mege himself was buried with Ni Rayang at the slopes of Keramil Paluh in Linge, Central Aceh, which until today it can still be found and are considered sacred by the locals. The cause of migrating was unknown. However, according to history, Raja Linge favoured his youngest son, Meurah Mege, causing the rest of his children to prefer to wander away.

Linga dynasty
 Adi Genali Raja Linge I in Gayo.
 Raja Sebayak Lingga became King of Karo in Karo land.
 Raja Merah Johan, founded the Lamuri Sultanate.
 Merah Silu, son of Merah Sinabung, founded Samudera Pasai Sultanate.
 Raja Linge II also known as Marah Lingga in Gayo.
 Raja Lingga III to XII in Gayo.
 Raja Lingga XIII became Amir al-Harb of Aceh Sultanate. In 1533, the new Johor Empire was founded in pre-independence Malaysia led by Sultan Alauddin Mansyur Syah. Raja Lingga XIII was appointed to be in the cabinet of the new government. His descendants established the Lingga Sultanate in Lingga Island of the Riau Islands, and his sovereignty extended to Riau Province (Indonesia), Temasek (Singapore) and parts of Malaya (Malaysia).

No documentation were recorded on the rulers of Sebayak Lingga Karo. During the era of Dutch East Indies, the monarchy was appointed again but for two eras only.
 Raja Sendi Sibayak Lingga, as chosen by the Dutch East Indies.
 Raja Kalilong Sibayak Lingga.

Dutch colonization

After initial Dutch resistance, which many Gayonese and Dutch were killed, the Dutch occupied the area during 1904–1942. During this time, the Gayonese developed a thriving cash crop economy in vegetables and coffee. Since the Dutch colonization, the Gayonese have gained access to higher levels of education, and participated to some degree in the Islamization and modernization of their homeland.

Surnames
Although it is not the practice of majority of Gayo society to have their surnames included, however there are a small group of them that still have their surnames attached to their given name especially those that are from Bebesen region. The purpose of the surname is only for them be identify and to be able to trace the individual's family lineage, thus it is not regarded as of great importance for the Gayo people.

Culture

Religion
The Gayonese are Sunni Muslims but practise a local form of Islam. Traces of ancient pre-Islamic traditions are still extant. In ancient times, the Gayonese believed in good and bad spirits and in holy men, both dead and alive. They would regularly give ritual offerings and sacrifices to the spirits, to holy men, and to their ancestors.

Conversion to Islam among the Gayo took multiple routes. From West Sumatra, Muslim merchants spread the religion to the highlands. From Aceh, the Aceh Sultanate Islamized the region. According to one Acehnese chronicle, the ruler employed holy war to justify the campaigns in the area. However, the expeditions were based on pre-Islamic raids on the area which were rebranded in religious terms after the conversion of Aceh. Economic reasons behind the raids still loomed large for Aceh.

Traditional dance and arts

 Didong
 Didong Alo
 Didong Sesuk
 Didong Niet
 Saman dance
 Bines dance
 Guel dance
 Munalo dance
 Sining dance
 Turun ku Aih Aunen dance
 Resam Berume dance
 Tuah Kukur
 Melengkan
 Dabus

Traditional cuisine
 Masam Jaeng
 Gutel
 Lepat
 Pulut Bekuah
 Cecah
 Pengat
 Gegaloh
 Gelame
 Duekali
 Dedah

Traditional cloth
 Upuh Ulen-Ulen

References

Further reading
Bowen, J. R., Sumatran Politics and Poetics: Gayo History, 1900–1989, Yale University Press, 1991 
Bowen, J. R., Muslims Through Discourse: Religion and Ritual in Gayo Society, Princeton University Press, 1993 

Ethnic groups in Indonesia
Ethnic groups in Sumatra
Ethnic groups in Aceh
Muslim communities of Indonesia